The Muslim College is a postgraduate Islamic seminary situated in Ealing, West London, that trains imams and religious leaders and provides Islamic education and training programmes for its students.  Established in 1986 by Sheikh Prof. M.A. Zaki Badawi, the Muslim College incorporates traditional and contemporary Islamic approaches to deliver its syllabi.

Zaki Badawi was principal of the College from its establishment in 1986 until his death in 2006. Dr Mosa Albezi is the current  Principal.

Footnotes and references

External links
Muslim College

Islamic schools in London
Further education colleges in London
Education in the London Borough of Ealing